The Grand Rapids Rampage was an arena football team based in Grand Rapids, Michigan. The team began play in 1998 in the Arena Football League as an expansion team. They were last coached by Steve Thonn. Their home arena was the Van Andel Arena.

History
In 1997, Dan DeVos was granted an expansion AFL franchise for the 1998 season, and was awarded the remains of the dormant Massachusetts Marauders franchise out of bankruptcy court. That team's first incarnation, the Detroit Drive, had been the league's first dynasty; the Drive had advanced to the ArenaBowl in all six years they played in Detroit, winning four times. They moved to Worcester, Massachusetts for the 1994 season before folding. Due to the four-year period of dormancy, the Rampage did not claim the Drive/Marauders' history as their own. Grand Rapids was the smallest market in which the AFL had a franchise at the times of its first/2009 disbanding. 

The Rampage played in the Van Andel Arena, which is also the home of the AHL's Grand Rapids Griffins. They competed in the Central Division of the American Conference.

The Grand Rapids Rampage started play in 1998 under coach Michael Trigg. In 2001, with notable players Clint Dolezel, and Terrill Shaw, the Rampage went on to win their first ArenaBowl. This game was broadcast live on the ABC Network.

The Rampage's official mascot was a Rhinoceros named Blitz.

The Rampage had a rivalry with the Nashville Kats, one which dates back to the original Kats. This rivalry solidified with the Rampage's defeat of Nashville in ArenaBowl XV.

The Rampage also shared a rivalry with the Chicago Rush, known as the Amtrak Classic, after the Amtrak railway system which connects the two cities. On July 6, 2008, the Amtrak Classic added an interesting chapter as the Rampage, losers of their last six meetings with Chicago, defeated their heavily favored opponents on the road. Grand Rapids entered the game as a 6 seed, and upended the #1 seeded Rush 58-41, in a game of controversial penalties and brawls.

On March 5, 2010, it was announced that the Rampage were officially out of business and had no plans to return.

Logo
The Rampage's logo was a red rhinoceros. Its end zone featured the team's secondary logo. However, it was changed to 'Arena Football' during the ArenaBowl in 2001.

Rampage highlights
 On Sunday, June 23, 2002, the Rampage hosted a game against the Georgia Force. After a low-scoring first quarter, the Rampage took a 28–15 halftime lead. However, the Force refused to go down, as they had a 41–35 lead with only 12 seconds left in the game. On one play, Quarterback Clint Dolezel threw a game-winning 31-yd touchdown pass to Offensive Specialist Steve Smith (who hadn't played a down that game until the final play). The Rampage would win 42-41. On the AFL's 20 Greatest Highlights Countdown, this is ranked at #13.
 On Saturday, February 5, 2005, in a road game against their division-rival, the Colorado Crush, Rampage quarterback Michael Bishop became the first Arena Football League player to run for 100 yards in a single game. It was only Bishop's third-ever start, yet he accomplished this feat on just six attempts. Despite falling 72–56, Bishop's helped set a bold new record. On the AFL's 20 Greatest Highlights Countdown, this is ranked at #12.
 In a pregame warm-up, quarterback Michael Bishop threw a pass from one end zone, across the field, through the uprights and into the stands. On the AFL's 20 Greatest Highlights Countdown, this is tied at #9.
 On Monday, March 24, 2008, The Rampage set the AFL record for the most points scored in a single game by a road team, beating the Kansas City Brigade 92–52. James Macpherson went 24–27, nine touchdowns, and 307 yards in his first start for the Rampage. MacPherson would later go on to break the franchise record for touchdown passes in a later game.

Season-by-season

Notable players

Arena Football Hall of Famers

Individual awards

All-Arena players
The following Rampage players were named to All-Arena Teams:
 QB Craig Kusick, Jr. (1), Clint Dolezel (1)
 WR Kenny Higgins (1)
 WR/DB Willis Marshall (1)
 WR/LB Michael Baker (1)
 K Brian Gowins (1)

All-Ironman players
The following Rampage players were named to All-Ironman Teams:
 FB/LB Chris Ryan (1), Chris Avery (2)
 WR/DB Timon Marshall (1), Jermaine Lewis (1)
 WR/LB Michael Baker (1), Jerome Riley (1)
 OL/DL Winfield Garnett (1)

All-Rookie players
The following Rampage players were named to All-Rookie Teams:
 OL/DL Buster Stanley, Corey Mayfield, Israel Raybon
 LB Michael McFadden
 DB Chris Martin
 DS JoJo Polk
 K Brian Gowins, Peter Martinez

Venue location and front office
The Grand Rapids Rampage played in the Van Andel Arena, which is located in downtown Grand Rapids.

Coaches

Notes

External links
 Grand Rapids Rampage at ArenaFan.com
 Grand Rapids Rampage historical scores

 
1998 establishments in Michigan
2009 disestablishments in Michigan